FamilyNet Radio was a Christian radio station that aired on SIRIUS Satellite Radio channel 161. It was a part of the FamilyNet organizations. It supported the merging of SIRIUS and XM Satellite Radio.

Programs 
Major programs aired on FamilyNet Radio include:

Wretched Radio with Todd Friel
The Dave Ramsey Show
In Touch with Dr. Charles Stanley
The 700 Club
Focus on the Family with Dr. James Dobson
Love Worth Finding with Dr. Adrian Rogers
Turning Point with Dr. David Jeremiah
PowerPoint with Jack Graham
Thru the Bible with J. Vernon McGee
New Life Live! with Steve Arterburn
Renewing Your Mind with R. C. Sproul
Hope in the Night with June HuntTruth For Life with Alistair BeggJay Sekulow Live! with Jay Alan SekulowCBN Newswatch''

References

External links 
 FamilyNet Radio 

Sirius Satellite Radio channels
Defunct radio stations in the United States
XM Satellite Radio